Conway's law is an adage that states organizations design systems that mirror their own communication structure. It is named after the computer programmer Melvin Conway, who introduced the idea in 1967. His original wording was:

The law is based on the reasoning that in order for a product to function, the authors and designers of its component parts must communicate with each other in order to ensure compatibility between the components. Therefore, the technical structure of a system will reflect the social boundaries of the organizations that produced it, across which communication is more difficult. 

In colloquial terms, it means complex products end up "shaped like" the organizational structure they are designed in or designed for. The law is applied primarily in the field of software architecture, though Conway directed it more broadly and its assumptions and conclusions apply to most technical fields.

Variations

Eric S. Raymond, an open-source advocate, restated Conway's law in The New Hacker's Dictionary, a reference work based on the Jargon File. The organization of the software and the organization of the software team will be congruent, he said. Summarizing an example in Conway's paper, Raymond wrote:

Raymond further presents Tom Cheatham's amendment of Conway's Law, stated as:

Yourdon and Constantine, in their 1979 book on Structured Design, gave a more strongly stated variation of Conway's Law:

James O. Coplien and Neil B. Harrison stated in a 2004 book concerned with organizational patterns of Agile software development:

More recent commentators have noted a corollary - for software projects with a long lifetime of code reuse, such as Microsoft Windows, the structure of the code mirrors not only the communication structure of the organization which created the most recent release, but also the communication structures of every previous team which worked on that code.

Interpretations

The law is, in a strict sense, only about correspondence; it does not state that communication structure is the cause of system structure, merely describes the connection. Different commentators have taken various positions on the direction of causality; that technical design causes the organization to restructure to fit, that the organizational structure dictates the technical design, or both. Conway's law was intended originally as a sociological observation, but many other interpretations are possible. The New Hacker's Dictionary entry uses it in a primarily humorous context, while participants at the 1968 National Symposium on Modular Programming considered it sufficiently serious and universal to dub it 'Conway's Law'. Opinions also vary on the desirability of the phenomenon; some say that the mirroring pattern is a helpful feature of such systems, while other interpretations say it's an undesirable result of organizational bias. Middle positions describe it as a necessary feature of compromise, undesirable in the abstract but necessary to handle human limitations.

Supporting evidence
An example of the impact of Conway's Law can be found in the design of some organization websites. Nigel Bevan stated in a 1997 paper, regarding usability issues in websites: "Organizations often produce web sites with a content and structure which mirrors the internal concerns of the organization rather than the needs of the users of the site."

Evidence in support of Conway's law has been published by a team of Massachusetts Institute of Technology (MIT) and Harvard Business School researchers who, using "the mirroring hypothesis" as an equivalent term for Conway's law, found "strong evidence to support the mirroring hypothesis", and that the "product developed by the loosely-coupled organization is significantly more modular than the product from the tightly-coupled organization". The authors highlight the impact of "organizational design decisions on the technical structure of the artifacts that these organizations subsequently develop".

Additional and likewise supportive case studies of Conway's law have been conducted by Nagappan, Murphy and Basili at the University of Maryland in collaboration with Microsoft, and by Syeed and Hammouda at Tampere University of Technology in Finland.

See also
Cognitive dimensions of notations
Deutsch limit 
Organizational theory
Good Regulator

References

Further reading
Alan MacCormack, John Rusnak & Carliss Baldwin, 2012, "Exploring the Duality between Product and Organizational Architectures: A Test of the 'Mirroring' Hypothesis," Research Policy 41:1309–1324 [earlier Harvard Business School Working Paper 08-039], see , accessed 9 March 2015.
Lise Hvatum & Allan Kelly, Eds., "What do I think about Conway's Law now? Conclusions of a EuroPLoP 2005 Focus Group," European Conference on Pattern Languages of Programs, Kloster Irsee, Germany, January 16, 2006, see , addressed 9 March 2015.
Lyra Colfer & Carliss Baldwin. "The Mirroring Hypothesis: Theory, Evidence and Exceptions." Harvard Business School Working Paper, No. 16-124, April 2016. (Revised May 2016.) See , accessed 2 August 2016.

Adages
Computer architecture statements
Software project management
Software design
Computer-related introductions in 1968